Outcast Lady is a 1934 sound film directed by Robert Z. Leonard and produced and distributed by Metro Goldwyn Mayer. The film stars Constance Bennett, Herbert Marshall and Mrs. Patrick Campbell. It is a sound version of Michael Arlen's 1924 novel The Green Hat, filmed in 1928 by MGM as A Woman of Affairs with Greta Garbo and John Gilbert.

Plot
Iris March agrees to marry a longtime friend of her brother Gerald, Boy Fenwick, when her true love, Napier Harpenden, spends four years away from her establishing a business in India. However, on their wedding night, a stranger reveals a secret about Boy's past to her that, when he learns that she has been informed of it, drives him to take his own life. When she refuses to disclose that secret to explain his suicide, suspicions about her character grow, and she is alienated from her brother and most of her acquaintances.

Cast
Constance Bennett as Iris March Fenwick
Herbert Marshall as Napier Harpenden
Mrs. Patrick Campbell as Lady Eve
Hugh Williams as Gerald March
Ralph Forbes as Boy Fenwick
Elizabeth Allan as Venice Harpenden
Henry Stephenson as Sir Maurice Harpenden
Robert Loraine as Hilary
Lumsden Hare as Guy
Leo G. Carroll as Dr. Masters (credited as Leo Carroll)

References

External links
Outcast Lady @ IMDb.com

1934 films
Remakes of American films
Films based on British novels
Films directed by Robert Z. Leonard
Metro-Goldwyn-Mayer films
Sound film remakes of silent films
1934 romantic drama films
American black-and-white films
American romantic drama films
1930s English-language films
1930s American films